Robert Francis Vasa (born May 7, 1951) is an American prelate of the Roman Catholic Church. On Monday, January 24, 2011,  Vasa was named the coadjutor bishop to Bishop Daniel F. Walsh of the Diocese of Santa Rosa in California by Pope Benedict XVI. Until then, he had been the fifth bishop of the Diocese of Baker in Oregon. On June 30, 2011, Walsh's resignation was accepted by Benedict XVI and Vasa succeeded him as bishop.

Biography

Early life 
Robert Vasa was born on May 7, 1951, in Lincoln, Nebraska, to Joe and Leona Vasa. From 1972 to 1976, he studied at Holy Trinity Seminary in Dallas, Texas, where he obtained a Master of Divinity degree.

Priesthood 
Vasa was ordained to the priesthood for the Diocese of Lincoln by Bishop Glennon Flavin on May 22, 1976. After his ordination, Vasa served as a curate at the Cathedral of the Risen Christ Parish.  He also taught at Pius X High School in Lincoln until 1977, when he became an advocate on the diocesan Marriage Tribunal. In 1979, Vasa entered the Pontifical Gregorian University in Rome, earning a Licentiate of Canon Law in 1981.

Following his return to Nebraska, Vasa was named assistant chancellor of the diocese and afterwards father prior of the local Columbian Squires chapter. He was appointed judicial vicar of the diocesan tribunal and pastor of St. James Parish in Cortland, Nebraska, in 1985. He directed the remodeling and fund drive for St. Stephen Parish in Exter, Nebraska.

In addition to his duties as judicial vicar, Vasa was appointed pastor of St. Peter Parish in  Lincoln in 1990. He was raised by the Vatican to the rank of honorary prelate in 1995. In 1996 Vasa was named vicar general of the diocese and moderator of the curia. He became chair of the Diocesan Building Commission in 1996 and served as pastor of St. Michael Parish in Cheney, Nebraska, from 1997 to 1999.

Bishop of Baker

On November 19, 1999, Vasa was named the fifth bishop of the Diocese of Baker by Pope John Paul II. He received his episcopal consecration on January 26, 2000, from Archbishop John Vlazny, with Bishops Thomas Connolly and Fabian Bruskewitz serving as co-consecrators. 

In a 2006 column, Vasa implied that Catholics who support abortion rights for women are guilty of a so-called heresy of murder.According to a Catholic News Service article, Vasa stated in February 2010 that St. Charles Medical Center in Bend, Oregon, located within the diocese, had "gradually moved away" from the church's ethical directives and could no longer be called Catholic. As a result, mass is no longer celebrated in the hospital chapel and the hospital returned all Catholic religious items to the diocese. However, the hospital retained the St. Charles name and the cross on his facility.

Bishop of Santa Rosa
On January 24, 2011, Pope Benedict XVI appointed Vasa as coadjutor bishop for the Diocese of Santa Rosa.  Vasa was installed on March 6, 2011.  On June 30, 2011, he succeeded Bishop Walsh.

Vasa served as the episcopal advisor to the Catholic Medical Association until 2014. He currently serves that role for the online religious education provider, CatechismClass.

On July 22, 2019, Vasa suspended from ministry Oscar Diaz, the pastor of St. Eugene Parish in Santa Rosa, California, after Diaz admitted to stealing $95, 000 from the parish. While local prosecutors said they did not have a strong enough case for criminal charges, Vasa said that Diaz would never be allow to work as a priest again. In December 2022, Vasa announced that the diocese would seek Chapter 11 bankruptcy protection in order to deal with a large volume of sexual abuse lawsuits against the clergy. On March 13, 2023, the Santa Rosa Diocese filed its Chapter 11 bankruptcy petition in the United States Bankruptcy Court for the Northern District of California, Santa Rosa Division. The case is The Roman Catholic Bishop of Santa Rosa, Bankr. N.D. Cal., Case No. 23-10113.

See also

 Catholic Church hierarchy
 Catholic Church in the United States
 Historical list of the Catholic bishops of the United States
 List of Catholic bishops of the United States
 Lists of patriarchs, archbishops, and bishops

References

External links
 Roman Catholic Diocese of Santa Rosa Official Site

Episcopal succession

 

1951 births
Living people
Roman Catholic bishops of Santa Rosa in California
21st-century Roman Catholic bishops in the United States
American people of Czech descent
Roman Catholic Ecclesiastical Province of Portland
Pontifical Gregorian University alumni
Pontifical North American College alumni
Roman Catholic Diocese of Lincoln
Roman Catholic bishops of Baker
Religious leaders from Nebraska